Brooke Vernon (born 20 October 2001) is an Australian rules footballer who plays for Western Bulldogs in the AFL Women's (AFLW). She has previously played for Carlton.

Club career
Vernon was drafted by Carlton in October 2019. After leaving Carlton in the off-season between the 2022 (A) AFL Women's season and the 2022 (B) AFL Women's season, Vernon was drafted by the Western Bulldogs.

References

External links

 

Living people
2001 births
Dandenong Stingrays players (NAB League Girls)
Carlton Football Club (AFLW) players
Australian rules footballers from Victoria (Australia)
Sportswomen from Victoria (Australia)